The Alexander Dennis Enviro100EV is an upcoming electric midibus to be built by British bus manufacturer Alexander Dennis. The Enviro100EV was unveiled as a new model in the Alexander Dennis range on 1 November 2022 at the Euro Bus Expo at the National Exhibition Centre in Birmingham, England, with series production set to commence in 2023. 

The Enviro100EV will be available as a low-floor integral midibus with Alexander Dennis' own in-house electric drivetrain, complementing the BYD-powered Enviro200EV in the Alexander Dennis product range. Plans have been made to potentially introduce a Transport for London specification Enviro100EV by mid-2024.

The Stagecoach Group was the first bus operator to order the Enviro100EV, with one autonomous example to be delivered to Stagecoach West Scotland for service on the CAVForth2 scheme, an extension of the original CAVForth scheme operated by autonomous Enviro200 MMCs, towards Dunfermline city centre via the Forth Road Bridge.

See also 

 List of buses

References

External links 

Enviro100EV
Low-floor buses
Midibuses
Battery electric buses
Vehicles introduced in 2022